Sorolopha cervicata is a moth of the family Tortricidae. It is found in Burma and Vietnam.

The wingspan is about 14 mm. The forewings are pale olive but whitish green posteriorly. The hindwings are light fuscous purple but paler on the basal half.

References

Moths described in 1973
Olethreutini
Moths of Asia